Bankesia conspurcatella is a species of moth of the Psychidae family. It is found in western Europe.

Description
The wingspan is 11–15 mm. Head light fuscous. Antennal ciliations 3. Forewings whitish -yellowish, with numerous small fuscous spots and strigulae; veins fuscous; indistinct darker dorsal spots towards base and before middle; a darker fuscous discal spot beyond middle. Hindwings light grey. Adults are on wing from January to April in one generation per year.

The larvae feed on lichens on tree-trunks from within a case made of lichens, soil and sand. The larva first overwinters and then pupates in winter within the case, which is attached to fences, rocks or cracks in tree bark.

References

Moths described in 1850
Psychidae
Moths of Europe